is a Japanese retired slalom canoeist who competed in the early 1970s. He finished 36th in the K-1 event at the 1972 Summer Olympics in Munich.

External links
Sports-reference.com profile

1947 births
Canoeists at the 1972 Summer Olympics
Japanese male canoeists
Living people
Olympic canoeists of Japan
Place of birth missing (living people)